Eliza Tinsley (1813–1882) was an English businessperson. She was the founder of the Eliza Tinsley Furniture or Eliza Tinsley & Company, Ltd.

She was born in Wolverhampton, Staffordshire, as the daughter of file maker Benjamin Butler (d. 1827) and Ann Shaw (d. 1829). She married Thomas Tinsley and lived at The Limes in Sedgley with her husband and six children. In 1851, she was widowed and inherited the nail-making business from her husband. In 1871, the company had 4,000 employees producing nails, chains, rivets and anchors.

Eliza Tinsley has a ward named after her at Rowley Regis Hospital.

References

Tinsley, Eliza (1813–1882), manufacturer; Oxford Dictionary of National Biography; 2004

1813 births
1882 deaths
19th-century English businesspeople
People from Wolverhampton
19th-century English businesswomen